Horned frog is a common name used to identify several kinds of frogs with hornlike features:
 Asian horned frog, genus Megophrys of the mesobatrachian Megophryidae
 Rough horned frog, genus Borneophrys of the mesobatrachian Megophryidae
 South American horned frog, genus Ceratophrys of the neobatrachian Leptodactylidae

See also

 Horned lizard or Phrynosoma, a genus of lizard native to North and Central America and sometimes called a "horned toad"
 Texas horned lizard or Phrynosoma cornutum, a species of horned lizard

Amphibian common names